Deniss Boroditš (born on 1 November 1979 in Tallinn) is a Chairman of the Board of TLT (AS Tallinna Linnatransport). AS Tallinna Linnatransport is a company operating Tallinn’s city public transport fleet (bus, tram, trolley).

He has been member of XII and XIII Riigikogu.

Member of Parliament 
April 2011 - July 2018 (7 years 4 months)
Member of Economic Affairs Committee; Chairman of Transit and
Logistics group

In 2001 he graduated from Concordia International University Estonia, studying the law.

From 2007 to 2011 he was the deputy mayor of Tallinn.

From 2004 to 2012 he was a member of Estonian Centre Party. Since 2013 he is a member of Estonian Reform Party.

From May 2019 he is the Honorary Consul of the Republic of Kazakhstan in Estonia.

References

Living people
1979 births
Estonian Centre Party politicians
Estonian Reform Party politicians
Members of the Riigikogu, 2011–2015
Members of the Riigikogu, 2015–2019
Politicians from Tallinn